George Mason Lovering (January 10, 1832 – April 2, 1919) was a Union Army soldier who received the Medal of Honor for meritorious service during the American Civil War.

Biography
He was born to James and Catherine Lovering on January 10, 1832, in Springfield, New Hampshire. The family soon moved to East Randolph (now Holbrook, Massachusetts), and George eventually joined the Randolph Light Infantry, a militia unit that was called into active service at the start of the Civil War. He served as First Sergeant in Company I of the 4th Massachusetts Militia Regiment. On June 14, 1863, Lovering took part in the Siege of Port Hudson, a Confederate stronghold on the Mississippi River. His courage in this battle resulted in Lovering being awarded a Medal of Honor in 1891, the only such recipient from Holbrook.

Lovering was commissioned as a First Lieutenant in the renamed 75th Regiment of U.S. Colored Troops, which was formed from the 3rd Infantry Corps d'Afrique. He participated in the Red River Campaign, then served in the bayous of Louisiana until he was mustered out in 1865.

He eventually moved to Maine, spending his final years living at a veterans home. He died at the age of 87 at St. Mary's Hospital in Lewiston, Maine. He is buried in Union Cemetery in Holbrook.

Medal of Honor citation
Rank and organization: First Sergeant, Company I, 4th Massachusetts Infantry. Place and date: At Port Hudson, La., June 14, 1863. Entered service at: East Randolph, Mass. Born: January 10, 1832, Springfield, N.H. Date of issue: November 19, 1891.

Citation:

During a momentary confusion in the ranks caused by other troops rushing upon the regiment, this soldier, with coolness and determination, rendered efficient aid in preventing a panic among the troops.

See also

List of Medal of Honor recipients
List of American Civil War Medal of Honor recipients: G–L

References

1832 births
1919 deaths
People from Springfield, New Hampshire
Union Army officers
United States Army Medal of Honor recipients
United States Army officers
People of Massachusetts in the American Civil War
People from Holbrook, Massachusetts
American Civil War recipients of the Medal of Honor
People from Lewiston, Maine